The Sonatina in G major for violin and piano, Op. 100, B. 183, was written by Antonín Dvořák between November 19 and December 3, 1893, in New York City.  It was the last chamber composition he wrote during his sojourn in the United States.  Dvořák catered the sonatina to the gradually developing musical abilities of his children, especially those of his 15-year-old daughter Otilie and 10-year-old son Toník, who played piano and violin respectively.  In a letter to Fritz Simrock on January 2, 1894, Dvořák conceived the piece in the following terms: "It is intended for youths (dedicated to my two children), but even grown-ups, adults, should be able to converse with it..." 
The sonatina was published by Simrock in Berlin in 1894.  It also exists in a version for cello and piano.

Structure

The four short movements of the sonatina each exhibit a simple and clear, formal structure (hence the diminutive, cf. sonata).  They all contain themes, which, like those already found in his other American chamber works (the String Quartet in F and the String Quintet in E), owe their inspiration to  Indian melodies and Negro spirituals, which are characterized by pentatonic scales and syncopated rhythm, among other traits. The mood of the composition is fresh and joyful. Only the second movement and part of the last movement are nostalgic; they are inspired by the composer's longing for his home country.

A motive for the slow movement Larghetto was hurriedly noted down on Dvořák's shirt sleeve while on a visit to Minnehaha Falls, in Minneapolis, Minnesota.  Simrock sold this movement separately, without the composer's permission, and Fritz Kreisler often performed it as Indian Lament. It also appeared as Indian Canzonetta; such romantic titles were not the composer's, but were added subsequently by publishers.

Footnotes
 Victor 12" record 74387, recorded 3/31/1914
 Antonín Dvořák: Sonatina G-Dur. Op. 100. Violino e piano. Urtext. Prague: Editio Bärenreiter, 2006. H 1364. ISMN M-2601-0389-4

References

External links 

 Performance of Sonatina in an arrangement for viola and piano by Dimitri Murrath (viola) and Vincent Planes(piano) from the Isabella Stewart Gardner Museum in MP3 format

Chamber music by Antonín Dvořák
Dvorak
1893 compositions
Compositions in G major